Félicien M'Banza (born 6 June 1977 in Bujumbura) is a Burundian former professional footballer who played as a striker.

International career
Mbanza was member of the Burundi national football team and presented the Burundian U-20 by 1995 FIFA World Youth Championship in Qatar and played three matches.

External links
 
 

1977 births
Living people
Sportspeople from Bujumbura
Burundian footballers
Burundi international footballers
Association football forwards
SC Bümpliz 78 players
SC Young Fellows Juventus players
SR Delémont players
Racing Besançon players
FC Alle players
Étoile Carouge FC players
Thonon Evian Grand Genève F.C. players
Burundian expatriate footballers
Expatriate footballers in France
Expatriate footballers in Switzerland
Burundian expatriate sportspeople in France
Burundian expatriate sportspeople in Switzerland